Puss Gets the Boot is a 1940 American animated short film and is the first short in what would become the Tom and Jerry cartoon series, though neither were yet referred to by these names. It was directed by William Hanna, Joseph Barbera, and produced by Rudolf Ising. It was based on the Aesop's Fable, The Cat and the Mice. As was the practice of MGM shorts at the time, only Rudolf Ising is credited. It was released to theaters on February 10, 1940, by Metro-Goldwyn-Mayer.

In this first short, the cat is named Jasper, and appears to be a mangy, battle-hardened street cat, more malicious than the character that Tom would develop into over time. The unnamed young mouse (known as Jinx) was similar to the ultimate Jerry character but made to be just a bit skinnier. The basic premise was the one that would become familiar to audiences; in The Art of Hanna-Barbera, Ted Sennett sums it up as "cat stalks and chases mouse in a frenzy of mayhem and slapstick violence". Though the studio executives were unimpressed, audiences loved the film and it was nominated for an Academy Award.

Synopsis
An adult cat named Tom (called Jasper in this episode) takes great pleasure in tormenting a young mouse named Jerry (named Jinx, though not referred to on-screen), who is trying to run away from Tom while he keeps grabbing Jerry's tail to keep him from running anywhere. Eventually, Jerry breaks free but goes into Tom's mouth, narrowly escaping. Tom then draws a mouse hole on the wall to trick Jerry into entering it. Jerry bangs against the wall so hard that it knocks him silly. Tom revives him using water from the fish tank and picks him up. Having slowly realized the situation, Jerry punches tom in the eye, causing him to yelp and screech in pain. The angry cat chases Jerry and accidentally bumps into a Greek pillar, where it breaks upon falling onto him along with the flowerpot that was standing on it. Mammy Two Shoes enters the room and scolds Tom for his unacceptable behavior, issuing him an ultimatum that if she catches him making one more mess, he will get kicked out of the house. Tom sulks off, Jerry chuckles at him and this causes Tom to chase him, but when Jerry holds a glass over the edge of the table, Tom backs off after seeing a furious Mammy walking away with the remains of the broken flowerpot, fearing that he will get himself into trouble again.

After Jerry puts the cup down, Tom sees his chance and rushes at him, but he holds back Tom by threatening to drop the glass again. Then Jerry drops the cup and Tom rushes to catch it. Jerry throws more cups, making it very hard for Tom to catch them all. As Jerry walks away with the last cup, feeling pretty smug that he has the advantage, Tom gets the idea: he drops a bunch of pillows on the ground. When Jerry tries to humiliate Tom by dropping the cup, it stays intact when it lands on the soft surface of one of the pillows. Jerry tries to escape but Tom catches him by the tail. Tom inadvertently throws Jerry onto a shelf, where he escapes and begins pelting him with several dishes, making sure that in order to blackmail Tom, he will force him to immediately "get the boot." Tom begins to feel tired of holding all the dishes, after which, in humiliation, Tom can only watch as Jerry drops one last dish on the ground, breaking it, and thus alerting Mammy to thinking Tom violated her ultimatum.

Mammy once again enters the room in frustration just as Jerry swims in Tom's milk bowl, uses his tail as a towel and finally kicks Tom, causing Tom to drop all of the dishes, creating a huge mess and forcing him to take the blame. Jerry flees the scene and dives into his hole just Mammy hits Tom with a broom, throws him out of the house and slams the door shut. As soon as Tom is kicked out from the house, Jerry waves to him, sticks his tongue out, puts a HOME SWEET HOME sign in front of his hole, and enters it.

Production and release
In June 1937, animator and storyman Joseph Barbera began to work for the Ising animation unit at MGM, then the largest studio in Hollywood. He learned that co-owner Louis B. Mayer wished to boost the animation department by encouraging the artists to develop some new cartoon characters, following the lack of success with its earlier cartoon series based on The Captain and the Kids comic strip. Barbera then teamed with fellow Ising unit animator and director William Hanna and pitched new ideas, among them was the concept of two "equal characters who were always in conflict with each other". An early thought involved a fox and a dog before they settled on a cat and mouse. The pair discussed their ideas with producer Fred Quimby, then the head of the short film department who, despite a lack of interest in it, gave them the green-light to produce one cartoon short.

The short, Puss Gets the Boot, featured a cat named Jasper and an unnamed mouse, named Jinx in pre-production, and an African American housemaid named Mammy Two Shoes. Leonard Maltin described it as "very new and special [...] that was to change the course of MGM cartoon production" and established the successful Tom and Jerry formula of comical cat and mouse chases with slapstick gags. It was released onto the theatre circuit on February 10, 1940, and the pair, having been advised by management not to produce any more, focused on other cartoons including Gallopin' Gals (1940) and Officer Pooch (1941). Matters changed, however, when Texas businesswoman Bessa Short sent a letter to MGM asking whether more cat and mouse shorts would be produced, which helped convince management to commission a series. A studio contest held to rename both characters was won by animator John Carr, who suggested Tom the cat and Jerry the mouse after the popular Christmastime cocktail, itself derived from the names of two characters in an 1821 stage play by William Moncrieff, an adaptation of 1821 Pierce Egan's book titled Life in London where the names originated, which was based on George Cruikshank's, Isaac Robert Cruikshank's, and Egan's own careers. Carr was awarded a first place prize of $50. Puss Gets the Boot was a critical success, earning an Academy Award nomination for Best Short Subject: Cartoons in 1941 despite the credits listing Ising and omitting Hanna and Barbera.

After MGM gave the green-light for Hanna and Barbera to continue, the studio entered production on The Midnight Snack (1941). The pair would continue to work on Tom and Jerry cartoons for the next fifteen years of their career.

Reception
Motion Picture Exhibitor reviewed the short on March 6, 1940: "Puss teases the mouse but when the latter learns that breakage in the house will lead to Puss being thrown out, the fun begins. Windup has the crockery crashing, the mouse victorious, Puss getting the boot."

Voice cast
Harry E. Lang as Tom Cat (aka Jasper)
William Hanna as Jerry Mouse (aka Jinx)
Lillian Randolph as Mammy Two Shoes (original)
June Foray and Thea Vidale as Mammy Two Shoes (re-edited)

Availability
 Blu-ray
 Tom and Jerry Golden Collection, Volume 1, Disc 1
 DVD
 Tom and Jerry Spotlight Collection: Double Feature, Disc 1
 Warner Bros. Home Entertainment Academy Award-Nominated Animation: Cinema Favorites
 Tom and Jerry Golden Collection, Volume 1, Disc 1
 Tom and Jerry: The Deluxe Anniversary Collection, Disc 1
 Warner Bros. Home Entertainment Academy Awards Animation Collection, Disc 2
 Tom and Jerry Spotlight Collection, Volume 2, Disc 1
 VHS
 Tom & Jerry's 50th Birthday Classics
 Laserdisc
 The Art of Tom and Jerry Volume 1, Disc 1, Side 1
 Tom & Jerry Classics
 iTunes
 Tom and Jerry, Volume 2

References

External links

 
 

1940s English-language films
1940 animated films
1940 short films
1940s American animated films
1940s animated short films
Short films directed by William Hanna
Short films directed by Joseph Barbera
American comedy short films
1940 comedy films
Metro-Goldwyn-Mayer animated short films
Films scored by Scott Bradley
Tom and Jerry short films
Films directed by Rudolf Ising
Animated films about cats
Animated films about mice
African-American comedy films
African-American animated films
Metro-Goldwyn-Mayer short films
Films produced by Fred Quimby
Metro-Goldwyn-Mayer cartoon studio short films
Fiction about animal cruelty